Martin Hynes is an American screenwriter, film director, actor, and film producer.

Life and career

Hynes was born and raised in Eugene, Oregon, and has a bachelor's degree in history from Columbia University.

Hynes wrote and directed The Go-Getter, starring Lou Taylor Pucci, Zooey Deschanel, Jena Malone, and Nick Offerman, which premiered to critical acclaim at the Sundance Film Festival.  He co-wrote the story for the Academy Award-winning Toy Story 4

Hynes is collaborating with Pharrell Williams on "Atlantis" - a feature film musical - at 20th Century Studios, and has written the film adaptation of Kate DiCamillo's novel, The Magician's Elephant, to be released by Netflix in 2022.

As an actor, Hynes starred as a young George Lucas in the short film George Lucas in Love, for which he received a Best Actor award in San Sebastián.

Prior to this, he wrote the script Stealing Stanford, which served as the inspiration for the film Stealing Harvard, although many changes were made to the script that were contrary to Hynes's wishes.

His first film, Al as in Al was written and filmed while Hynes was a student at the USC graduate film school, which he attended on the Paramount Pictures Fellowship. Al as in Al premiered at HBO's U.S. Comedy Arts Festival, and was chosen by USC as one of the best films in the film school's  history

References

External links
 

American male screenwriters
American film directors
American male film actors
Year of birth missing (living people)
Living people
USC School of Cinematic Arts alumni
Male actors from Eugene, Oregon
Columbia College (New York) alumni
Screenwriters from Oregon
Businesspeople from Eugene, Oregon